Fernando Ignacio Carbone Campoverde (born 14 March 1959) is a Peruvian Medical Surgeon. He was the Minister of Health of Peru from 2002 to 2003.

Biography 
Fernando Carbone Campoverde is the son of Juan Carbone Fossa and Nelly Campoverde Ayres. He studied at the Colegio San Agustín in Lima, later entering the National University of San Marcos, where he studied medicine.

Between 1995 and 2000 he was a member of the Family Commission of the Peruvian Episcopal Conference. Between 1998 and 1999 he was a member of the Ethics Commission of the Medical College of Peru. He collaborated with the Government Planning Commission of Possible Peru in 2000 and was a member of the Transfer Commission of the Health Sector in 2001. Since 1990 he has been a consultant and speaker on the themes of poverty, development, family planning, international cooperation, strategic planning and organizational development.

He had been the Vice Minister of Health of Peru between 2001 and 2002 and the Minister of Health between 2002 and 2003. Currently he works as a project coordinator for Medicus Mundi International in Peru.

Minister of Health 
Carbone completed a number of large projects as Peruvian Minister of Health. In 2002 Carbone issued a proposal of reforms to replace the General Health Law, limiting various reproductive rights in the process. This included his extending legal rights to fertilized eggs from the moment of conception, a proposal which received much criticism. Another object of criticism was his refraining from the distribution of the Next Day Pill across the country, despite demands from various NGOs.

An official 2002 report by Carbone suggested that the government of Alberto Fujimori had been involved in the forced sterilizations of almost 250,000 people between 1996 and 2000, predominantly indigenous women.

References 

1959 births
Living people
Peruvian surgeons
People from Lima